Duplex halmaherensis is a moth of the family Erebidae first described by Michael Fibiger in 2008. It is known from the Halmahera and Tanimbar islands of Indonesia.

The wingspan is 7.5–8 mm. The forewing is grey, but the medial area is dark grey and the upper half of the postmedial area is light grey. The reniform stigma is bright, ovoid and yellow. All crosslines are present and black. The antemedial and postmedial lines are prominent, the former being sharply angled subcostally, the latter waved. The subterminal line is waved and the terminal line is marked by tight black interveinal spots. The hindwing is dark grey, without a discal spot. The underside of the forewing is light brown, while the underside of the hindwing is light grey.

References

Micronoctuini
Taxa named by Michael Fibiger
Moths described in 2008